George Malik Pickens Jr. (born March 4, 2001) is an American football wide receiver for the Pittsburgh Steelers of the National Football League (NFL). He played college football at Georgia and was drafted by the Steelers in the second round of the 2022 NFL Draft.

Early years
Pickens attended Hoover High School in Hoover, Alabama. As a senior, he had 69 receptions for 1,368 yards and 16 touchdowns. He played in the 2019 Under Armour All-American Game. A five star recruit, he originally committed to Auburn University to play college football before changing his commitment to the University of Georgia.

College career
Pickens earned immediate playing time his freshman year at Georgia in 2019, leading the team in receptions (49), receiving yards (727) and receiving touchdowns (8). In the following season Pickens caught 36 passes for 513 yards and a team-leading six touchdowns in an eight-game season shortened by the COVID-19 pandemic. In the spring of 2021, Pickens tore his ACL causing him to miss most of his junior season. He returned to play in the final four games of the year, catching just five passes, but made an important 52-yard reception in Georgia's win over Alabama in the 2022 College Football Playoff National Championship game. Pickens declared for the 2022 NFL Draft following the season.

Professional career

Pickens was drafted by the Pittsburgh Steelers in the second round (52nd overall) of the 2022 NFL Draft.

In Week 3 against the Cleveland Browns, Pickens corralled a one-handed catch while fully extending his body in the air. It was called by some the "Catch of the Year." In Week 4, against the New York Jets, he had six receptions for 102 yards in the 24–20 loss. Pickens scored his first professional touchdown during primetime in Week 7 against the Miami Dolphins. In Week 16, Pickens caught the game-winning touchdown against the Las Vegas Raiders with less than a minute remaining.

He finished the 2022 season with 52 receptions for 801 yards and a team-high four receiving touchdowns.

NFL career statistics

References

External links
 Pittsburgh Steelers bio
 Georgia Bulldogs bio

2001 births
Living people
American football wide receivers
Georgia Bulldogs football players
Pittsburgh Steelers players
People from Hoover, Alabama
Players of American football from Alabama